Xavier Proctor (born November 1, 1990) is an American football offensive tackle who is currently a free agent. He played college football at North Carolina Central University and attended Mount Hebron High School in Ellicott City, Maryland. He has also been a member of the Detroit Lions, New York Giants and Hamilton Tiger-Cats.

College career
Proctor played as a defensive lineman for the North Carolina Central Eagles from 2008 to 2012. He was redshirted in 2008. He majored in history.

Professional career

Orlando Predators
Proctor was signed by the Orlando Predators on July 10, 2013. He was activated from Other League Exempt on July 26, 2016.

Detroit Lions
Proctor signed with the Detroit Lions on August 1, 2013. He was released by the Lions on August 31, 2013 and re-signed to the Lions' practice squad on September 4, 2013. He was moved from defensive tackle to offensive tackle in June 2015. Proctor was released by the Lions on September 5, 2015.

New York Giants
Proctor was signed to the New York Giants' practice squad on October 15, 2015. He was released by the Giants on October 21, 2015.

Hamilton Tiger-Cats
Proctor signed with the Hamilton Tiger-Cats on April 19, 2016. He was released by the Tiger-Cats on June 19 and signed to the team's practice roster the same day. He was released by the team on June 30, 2016.

References

External links
Just Sports Stats
Arena Football League profile

Living people
1990 births
Players of American football from West Virginia
American football defensive tackles
Canadian football offensive linemen
African-American players of American football
African-American players of Canadian football
North Carolina Central Eagles football players
Orlando Predators players
Detroit Lions players
New York Giants players
Hamilton Tiger-Cats players
Sportspeople from Morgantown, West Virginia
People from Ellicott City, Maryland
21st-century African-American sportspeople